Pollenia leclercqiana is a species of cluster fly in the family Polleniidae.

Distribution 
France, Spain, Morocco.

References 

Polleniidae
Insects described in 1978
Diptera of Europe